In the Dove Book and other medieval Russian books, Buyan (sometimes transliterated as Bujan) is described as a mysterious island in the ocean with the ability to appear and disappear with the tide. Three brothers—Northern, Western, and Eastern Winds—live there, and also the Zoryas, solar goddesses who are servants or daughters of the solar god Dazhbog.

Background 
The island of Buyan features prominently in many famous myths; Koschei the Deathless keeps his soul or immortality hidden there, secreted inside a needle placed inside an egg in the mystical  oak-tree; other legends call the island the source of all weather, generated there and sent forth into the world by the god Perun. Buyan also appears in  The Tale of Tsar Saltan, of His Son the Renowned and Mighty Bogatyr Prince Gvidon Saltanovich, and of the Beautiful Princess-Swan (an opera by Nikolai Rimsky-Korsakov, set partially in Tmutarakan and in Buyan's magical city of Ledenets ("sugary")) and in many other  Slavic skazkas. Furthermore, Buyan has the mythical stone with healing and magic powers, known as the  Alatyr, which is guarded by the bird Gagana and by Garafena the serpent.

Some scholars (such as V. B. Vilibakhov) assert that Buyan is actually a Slavic name for some real island, most likely Rügen in the Baltic Sea.

Influence
 The Buyan-class corvette is a class of corvettes used by the Russian Navy.
 Buyan. an uninhabited island on the northern parts of the Severnaya Zemlya Archipelago off the northern coast of Russia.
 Buyan Insula, an insula (island) within Ligeia Mare on Saturn's moon Titan.
 Buyan is mentioned in Catherynne M. Valente's novel Deathless as the "Country of Life", a grotesque island nation ruled by Koschei where everything (even the flesh-like buildings) is organic and alive. It is also mentioned in another work by Catherine M. Valente, The Girl Who Circumnavigated Fairyland in a Ship of Her Own Making, in which the Marquess of Fairyland has conducted a peace treaty with the island country.
 Buyan is used as the name of one of the planets in Signalis.

See also
 Avalon
 Kingdom of Opona
 Kitezh

References

Bibliography
 

Locations in Slavic mythology
Mythological kingdoms, empires, and countries
Mythological islands
Russian mythology